Nationality words link to articles with information on the nation's poetry or literature (for instance, Irish or France).

Events

Works

Great Britain
 Thomas Collins, The Penitent Publican
 Robert Dowland, A Musicall Banquet, includes songs by John Dowland
 Michael Drayton, A Heavenly Harmonie, new edition of The Harmonie of the Church, originally published in 1564
 Giles Fletcher, Christs Victorie, and Triumph in Heaven, and Earth, Over, and After Death
 Thomas Gainsford, The Vision and Discourse of Henry the Seventh
 John Heath, Two Centuries of Epigrammes
 Robert Jones, The Muses Gardin for Delights; or, The Fift Book of Ayres, songs
 Richard Rich, Newes from Virginia
 Roger Sharpe, More Fools Yet

Other
 Gaspar Perez de Villagra, Historia de la Nueva Mexico, regarded as the first drama and the first epic poem of European origin generated in the present United States

Births
 January 15 (bapt.) – Sidney Godolphin (killed in action 1643), English
 July 4 – Paul Scarron (died 1660), French poet, playwright and novelist
 July 28 (bapt.) – Henry Glapthorne (died c. 1643), English dramatist and poet
 Also:
 Jeremias de Dekker, birth year uncertain (died 1666), Dutch
 Mehmed IV Giray (died 1674), poet and khan of the Crimean Khanate
 Ye Wanwan (died 1632, according to one source, 1633 according to another), Chinese poet and daughter of poet Shen Yixiu; also sister of women poets Ye Xiaowan and Ye Xiaoluan

Deaths
 October 6 – Hosokawa Fujitaka 細川藤孝, also known as Hosokawa Yūsai 細川幽斎 (born 1534), Japanese Sengoku period feudal warlord who was a prominent retainer of the last Ashikaga shōguns; father of Hosokawa Tadaoki, an Oda clan senior general; after the 1582 Incident at Honnō-ji, he took the Buddhist tonsure and changed his name to "Yūsai" but remained an active force in politics, under Shōguns Toyotomi Hideyoshi and Tokugawa Ieyasu
 Also – Yuan Hongdao 袁宏道 (born 1568), Chinese poet of the Ming Dynasty, and one of the Three Yuan Brothers

Notes

17th-century poetry
Poetry